Harry Oliver was an American humorist, artist and art director.

Harry or Harold Oliver may also refer to:

Harry Oliver (footballer) (1921–1994), English footballer
Harry Oliver (ice hockey) (1898–1985), Canadian ice hockey player
Harold Oliver (Australian footballer) (1891-1958), Australian rules footballer
Harold Oliver (footballer, born 1863) (1863–?), English footballer

See also

Henry Oliver (disambiguation)